Om Prakash (born Om Prakash Chibber 19 December 1919 – 21 February 1998) was an Indian film actor. He was born in Jammu  as Om Prakash Chibber and went on to become a well-known character actor of Hindi Cinema. His most well-known movies are Namak Halaal (1982), Gopi (1970), Hulchul (1971) and Sharaabi (1984).

He also produced Jahanaara starring Bharat Bhushan, Shashikala, Prithviraj Kapoor and Mala Sinha in the title role of Jahanaara.

Om Prakash played the leading man in films like Dus Lakh, Annadata, Charandas and Sadhu aur Shaitan. His pivotal roles in the films Dil Daulat Duniya, Gopi, Apna Desh, Chupke Chupke, Julie, Joroo Ka Ghulam, Aa Gale Lag Jaa, Pyar Kiye Jaa, Padosan and Buddha Mil Gaya are considered to be among his best along with Daddu in Namak Halaal and De Silva in Zanjeer. His roles in Sharaabi, Bharosa, Tere Ghar Ke Samne, Mere Hamdam Mere Dost, Loafer and Dil Tera Diwana were also appreciated.

He is known for his roles in comedy films. One of his best performances in his later years were Naukar Biwi Ka, Sharaabi (1984) and Chameli Ki Shaadi, where he played a role that was pivotal in the movie. His role in Gopi with Dilip Kumar is considered best in terms of acting. Critics still think he gave better performance in tragic scenes in front of Dilip Kumar. Once Dilip Kumar revealed the fact, "I was only afraid once in my acting career and it was during Gopi when Om Prakashji's performance overshadowed mine".

Early life and education

He was fascinated by theatre, music and films. He started taking lessons in classical music when he was just twelve and was recognised as a master in no time.

Career

He joined All India Radio in 1937 on a monthly salary of Rs 25. He was known as "Fateh Din", a radio personality and his programmes made him popular all over Punjab.

He was regaling people at a wedding one day when the well-known filmmaker Dalsukh Pancholi spotted him and asked to see him in his Lahore office. Pancholi gave Prakash his first break as an actor in the film Daasi. He was paid only Rs 80, but the film earned him the kind of recognition that would give him a means of livelihood for a lifetime. It was his first major role; he had played a bit role in Sharif Badmash, a silent film. He followed his good work in Daasi and with Pancholi's Dhamki and Aayee Bahar.

Soon after the Partition he came to Delhi and then to Bombay (now Mumbai). Baldev Raj Chopra noticed his talent when he was a film journalist and critic; he urged Prakash to carry on with his acting career. He was sure Om Prakash had the talent to prove himself a versatile actor. The actor had to struggle initially. He got his first break as a villain in a film called Lakhpati. It won him acclaim and got him roles in films like Lahore, Char Din and Raat Ki Rani. It was during this phase in his career that he did Azaad with Dilip Kumar,Mera Naam Joker  with Raj Kapoor and Miss Mary, Bahar, Pehli Jhalak, Asha and Man-Mauji with Kishore Kumar followed by Howrah Bridge with Ashok Kumar and then Tere Ghar Ke Samne with Dev Anand. He was noted for his performance in both films in spite of the presence of powerful star personas like Kishore Kumar, Dilip Kumar, Raj Kapoor, Ashok Kumar and Dev Anand. He had developed a style of his own, a style which was going to take him places and earn him a big name in the world of film entertainment for the next forty years.

Om Prakash soon became a household name. He was good in almost every character he played. He was the comedian, the family man burdened with problems, the accountant, the alcoholic fallen on bad days because of the evil designs of the villain, the nagged husband, the old man in love, the wily politician and the big brother with a heart of gold. He played an assortment of characters with the same ease and had some of the best directors vying for him every time they had a role which they felt only he could play. His role in Gopi is still remembered, some analysts believe he has overshadowed Dilip Saab.

Om Prakash was a versatile actor with 307 films to his credit. One can never forget his comic performances in Howrah Bridge, Dus Lakh (he won his first major award for this performance), Pyar Kiye Jaa, Padosan, Sadhu Aur Shaitaan, Dil Daulat Duniya, Chupke Chupke, Namak Halaal, Gol Maal and Chameli Ki Shaadi.  His performance as Dilip Kumar's elder brother in Gopi gave his career new impetus. He proved that he could play mature roles with equal ease and depth: Films such as Chacha Zindabad, Khandan, Haryali Aur Raasta, Dil Apna Aur Preet Parai, Pati Patni, Neend Hamari Khwab Tumhare, Mere Hamdam Mere Dost, Annadata, Ek Shriman Ek Shrimati, Doli, Chirag, Amar Prem, Aankh Micholi, Ek Hasina Do Diwane, Anuraag, Zanjeer, Sagina, Aa Gale Lag Jaa, Loafer, Roti, Julie, Khushboo, Lawaaris, Bandish, Sharaabi and Chameli Ki Shaadi.

Om Prakash had a special rapport with Amitabh Bachchan and both worked in many successful films from Zanjeer to Sharaabi.

Prakash produced many films including Sanjog (1961), Jahan Ara (1964) and Gateway of India (1957).

Death

He used to reside at Union Park, Chembur. Om Prakash suffered a massive heart attack in his home and was rushed to Lilavati Hospital in Mumbai where he suffered another heart attack and went into a coma from which he never recovered. He died on 21 February 1998.

Selected filmography

 Daasi (1944) as Najam / Ragini / A.S.Gyani / Om Prakash Chibber / Kalavati / Khairati
 Zameen Aasmaan (1946)
 Chaman (1948, punjabi movie)
 Jalsa (1948)
 Ek Teri Nishani (1949)
 Naach (1949 film)|Naach (1949)
 Lachhi (1949) Punjabi movie 
 Sawan Bhadon (1949)
 Raat Ki Rani (1949)
 Lahore (1949)
 Ek Teri Nishani (1949)
 Char Din (1949)
 Bansaria (1949)
 Bhaiyya Ji (1950) He Directed this punjabi movie also 
 Phumman (1950)
 Madari (1950)
 Sargam (1950) as Seth Roopchand
 Sabak (1950)
 Rupaiya (1950)
 Sabz Baag (1951)
 Nazneen (1951)
 Khazana (1951)
 Bahar (1951) as Choudhry Goverdhanlal Patwardhanlal
 Anhonee (1952) as Shyam Sundar Laddan
 Poonam (1952) as Sajju Ram Trivedi
 Hamari Duniya (1952)
 Ghungroo (1952)
 Shikast (1953) as Dheeru
 Rail Ka Dibba (1953) as Nirogi
 Lehren (1953)
 Ladki (1953) as Hazurdas
 Firdaus (1953)
 Dhuaan (1953)
 Chalis Baba Ek Chor (1953)
 Aas (1953) as Masterji
 Ramman (1954) (unreleased)
 Ilzam (1954)
 Dost (1954)
 Pooja (1954)
 Kavi (1954)
 Danka (1954)
 Chor Bazar (1954) as Yusuf Ustad
 Bazooband (1954) as Sanwariya
 Barati (1954 film) (1954)
 Marine Drive (1955)
 Sitara (1955)
 Shri Nagad Narayan (1955)
 Pehli Jhalak (1955) as Jwalaprasad Raiseazam
 Musafirkhana (1955) as Gulyar Khan Kabuli
 Lutera (1955)
 Lagan (1955)
 Kundan (1955) as Uma's foster father
 Hoor-E-Arab (1955)
 Duniya Gol Hai (1955)
 Bhagwat Mahima (1955)
 Azaad (1955) as Head Constable Motilal
 Albeli (1955)
 Shrimati 420 (1956)
 Mem Sahib (1956) as Brothel Patron
 Patrani (1956) as Vichitram
 Fifty Fifty (1956)
 Dhake Ki Malmal (1956)
 Chhoo Mantar (1956) as Gulzar Khan (uncredited)
 Bhai-Bhai (1956) as Bulbul
 Basant Bahar (1956) as Narsin
 Muklawa (Punjabi film) (1957)
 Sheroo (1957)
 Sharada (1957) as Mohan (Guest Appearance)
 Miss Mary (1957) as Nakdau
 Gateway of India (1957) as Man with broken wrist watch
 Garma Garam (1957)
 Ek Jhalak (1957)
 Bhabhi (1957) as Lata's father-in-law
 Aasha (1957) as Hasmukhlal
 Miss 58 (1958)
 Chandu (1958)
 Taxi Stand (1958)
 Sohni Mahiwal (1958)
 Police (1958)
 Karigar (1958) as Girdhari
 Howrah Bridge (1958) as Shyamu, Tangewala
 Baghi Sipahi (1958)
 Amardeep (1958) as Man who gets conned
 Pyar Ki Rahen (1959)
 Kanhaiya (1959) as Vedji
 Didi (1959) as Lala Daulatram
 Chacha Zindabad (1959) as Contractor Mr. Verma ( He Directed this movie also )
 Zalim Jadugar (1960)
 Patang (1960) as Bhole Nath
 Mehlon Ke Khwab (1960) as Hotel Manager
 Jaali Note (1960) as C.I.D. Constable Pandu / Nandlal (uncredited)
 Dil Apna Aur Preet Parai (1960) as Girdhari
 College Girl (1960) as Hakeem Ramprasad
 Bindya (1960) as Shastriji
 Aanchal (1960) as Constable Dharamdas
 Sanjog (1961) as Diwan Girdharilal
 Do Bhai (1961) as Kashi Nath
 Bhabhi Ki Chudiyan (1961) as Prabha's dad
 Hong Kong (1962)
 Hariyali Aur Rasta (1962) as Joseph
 Isi Ka Naam Duniya Hai (1962)
 Shaadi (1962) as Seth Daulatram
 Naughty Boy (1962) as Vaidraj Churandas 'Jari-Bhuti' Chaturvedi
 Manmauji (1962) as Rai Saheb Bhola Ram
 Dil Tera Diwana (1962) as Captain Dayaram
 Half Ticket (1962)
 Tere Ghar Ke Samne (1963) as Lala Jagannath, Rakesh's Father
 Bharosa (1963) as Laxmiprasad Daulatram
 Pyaar Kiya To Darna Kya (1963) as Asharam
 Nartakee (1963) .... Seth. Jamna Das
 Kahin Pyaar Na Ho Jaaye (1963)
 Jab Se Tumhe Dekha Hai (1963) .... Qawwal
 Daal Me Kala (1964) .... Banke Bihari
 Suhagan (1964) .... Dukhiram
 Maain Bhi Ladki Hun (1964) .... Din Dayal 'Raja'
 Raj Kumar (1964) .... Bimasal
 Cha Cha Cha (1964) .... Dinanath
 Mera Qasoor Kya Hai (1964) .... Rasila
 Kaise Kahoon (1964) .... Mamaji
 Jahan Ara (1964)
 Door Ki Awaaz (1964) .... Dhanpath Rai
 Aap Ki Parchhaiyan (1964) .... Asha's dad
 Naya Kanoon (1965) .... Om Prakash Munshi
 Khandan (1965) .... Jeevandas Lal
 Duniya Hai Dilwalon Ki (1966)
 Pyar Kiye Jaa (1966) .... Ramlal
 Pati Patni (1966) .... Dhanprasad
 Neend Hamari Khwab Tumhare (1966) .... Ajoo Hajam / Nawab Ajmutullah Khan
 Labela (1966)
 Kunwari (1966)
 Dus Lakh (1966) .... Gokulchand
 Do Dilon Ki Dastaan (1966)
 Laat Saheb (1967) .... Munshi
 Around the World (1967)
 Aman (1967) .... Hurato
 Do Kaliyaan (1968) .... Kiran's Father
 Padosan (1968) .... Kunverji - friendly appearance
 Sadhu Aur Shaitaan (1968) .... Sadhuram
 Parivar (1968) .... Karamchand
 Mere Hamdam Mere Dost (1968) .... Dhand Melaram
 Kanyadaan (1968) .... Bansi
 Gauri (1968) .... Maniram
 Ek Kali Muskai (1968) .... Lala Saheb
 Man Ka Meet (1969) .... Lala Balwant Rai
 Soldier as Thakur Daler Singh (1969)
 Pyaasi Sham (1969) .... Shankarlal's dad
 Sajan (1969) .... Driver - Balam
 Ek Shriman Ek Shrimati (1969) .... Mama Ji / Choudhry Sahab
 Doli (1969) .... Dwarka (Prem's dad) (as Om Parkash)
 Chirag (1969) .... Dr. O.P. Chibber
 Badi Didi (1969) .... Dayal
 Suhana Safar (1970)
 Mera Naam Joker (1970) .... Dr. Om Prakash (Gemini Circus) (Guest Appearance)
 Saas Bhi Kabhi Bahu Thi (1970) .... Motilal Chaudhary
 Pushpanjali (1970) .... Major Bharti
 Purab Aur Paschim (1970) as Mohan's father-in-law (Guest Appearance)
 Gopi (1970) as Girdharilal
 Ghar Ghar Ki Kahani (1970) as Sadhuram
 Aansoo Aur Muskan (1970) as Anwar
 Parwana (1971) as Ashok Varma
 Paraya Dhan (1971) as Gangaram
 Buddha Mil Gaya (1971) .... Girdharilal Sharma
 Narad Leela (1972)
 Maalik Tere Bande Hum (1972)
 Kavi Sammelan (1972)
 Amar Prem (1972) .... Natwarlal
 Ek Hasina Do Diwane (1972) .... Major - Neeta's dad
 Joroo Ka Ghulam (1972) .... Shyamlal
 Sub Ka Saathi (1972) .... Maya Das
 Rani Mera Naam (1972)
 Mome Ki Gudiya (1972) .... Dindayal
 Dil Daulat Duniya (1972) .... Udharchand Shikarpuri
 Apna Desh (1972) .... Dharamdas
 Annadata (1972) .... Ambarprasad
 Aankh Micholi (1972) .... Seth Ramlal
 Jai Hanuman (1973)
 Loafer (1973) .... Gopinath
 Sone Ke Haath (1973)
 Zanjeer (1973) .... De Silva
 Aa Gale Lag Jaa (1973) .... Preeti's father
 Teen Chor (1973)
 Phagun (1973) .... Dr. M.K. Effendi
 Man Jeete Jag Jeet (1973) .... Punjabi
 Kahani Hum Sab Ki (1973) .... Bhagwan Das
 Shubdin (1974)
 Kshitij (1974)
 Naya Din Nai Raat (1974) .... Banarasilal
 Do Chattane (1974) .... Pagal Chacha
 Sagina (1974) .... Guru
 International Crook (1974) .... Havaldar Rao
 Roti (1974) .... Lalaji
 Dukh Bhanjan Tera Naam (1974)
 Chowkidar (1974) .... Shambhu
 Archana (1974) .... Dr. Arun
 Vardaan (1975) .... Banwari Sharma
 Romeo in Sikkim (1975)
 Aandhi (1975) .... Lallu Lal (Campaign Manager)
 Julie (1975) .... Maurice (Julie's Father)
 Chupke Chupke (1975) .... Raghavendra Sharma (Raghav)
 Sunehra Sansar (1975) .... Shankarlal
 Raaja (1975) .... Rani's Father
 Dhoti Lota Aur Chowpatty (1975)
 Khushboo (1975)
 Sangat (1976)
 Papi Tarey Anek (1976)
 Nehle Pe Dehla (1976) .... Mangal
 Maa (1976) .... Gopaldas (Nimmi's dad)
 Alaap (1977) .... Triloki Prasad
 Aashiq Hoon Baharon Ka (1977) .... Mr. Jamunadas
 Tinku (1977) .... Ramdin
 Saheb Bahadur (1977) .... Dy. Collector Hare Murari
 Mera Vachan Geeta Ki Kasam (1977) .... Yar Khan
 Duniyadari (1977) .... Barkha's Father
 Charandas (1977) .... Charandas
 Aakhri Goli (1977)
 Sone Ki Lanka (1978)
 Naya Daur (1978) .... Chopra
 Parmatma (1978) .... Hotel Clerk (voice, uncredited)
 Nawab Sahib (1978) .... Nawab Sahib
 Hamara Sansar (1978) .... Seth HarishChandra
 Daku Aur Jawan (1978) .... Bansi
 Gol Maal (1979) .... Senior Police Officer
 Sukhi Pariwar (1979) .... Kuldeep's office worker
 Bebus (1979)
 Do Premee (1980) .... Retd. Col. Bhagwant Singh
 Do Aur Do Paanch (1980) .... Ustad, Prisoner #203 (Guest Appearance)
 Abdullah (1980) .... Pandit
 Bandish (1980) .... Kishan's dad
 Aas Paas (1981) .... Seema's Father
 Naram Garam (1981) .... Swamiji (Special appearance)
 Lawaaris (1981) .... Dr. Goel
 Itni Si Baat (1981) .... Mukundilal
 Biwi-O-Biwi (1981) .... Chander's Father (uncredited)
 Dhanwan (1981)
 Ek Aur Ek Gyarah (1981) .... Biharilal
 Sharada (1981) .... Taradevi's husband
 Maan Gaye Ustaad (1981) .... Abba
 Bharosa (1981)
 Eent Ka Jawab Patthar (1982) .... Nawab Saab
 Namak Halaal (1982) .... Dasrath Singh (Daddu)
 Badle Ki Aag (1982) .... Man needed money for daughter's marriage (uncredited)
 Dil-E-Nadaan (1982) .... Asha's dad
 Prem Rog (1982) .... Panditji
 Dharam Kanta (1982) .... Fakira
 Johnny I Love You (1982) .... Colonel
 Love in Goa (1983) .... Vinayak Rao
 Rang Birangi (1983) .... Retired Judge Ajit Bannerjee
 Naukar Biwi Ka (1983) .... Jagirdar Bishamber Nath
 Shubh Kaamna (1983) .... Vithalbhai
 Pyaasi Aankhen (1983)
 Ek Din Bahu Ka (1983) .... Lalaji - Father in law (uncredited)
 Sharaabi (1984) .... Munshi Phoolchand
 Raaj Tilak (1984) .... Sardar Zuberi
 Ram Ki Ganga (1984) .... Ramdas
 Yeh Ishq Nahin Aasaan (1984) .... Nawab
 Raja Aur Rana (1984) .... Imran Khan
 Pyaase Honth (1985) .... Shambhu
 Do Dilon Ki Dastaan (1985) .... Mr. Saxena
 Meetha Zehar (1985)
 Alag Alag (1985) .... Khan
 Awara Baap (1985) .... Seth Gopal Das / Gopu
 Kali Basti (1985) .... Peter Pereira
 Kaanch Ki Deewar (1986) .... Dhurjan's victim
 Chameli Ki Shaadi (1986) .... Mastram Pehalwan
 Bhagwan Dada (1986) .... Drunken husband
 Karamdaata (1986) .... Khan (doctor)
 Insaniyat Ke Dushman (1987) .... Saxena
 Imaandaar (1987) .... Mr. Nath
 Kalyug Aur Ramayan (1987) .... Dashrath
 Rahi (1987) .... Dindayal
 Hawalaat (1987) .... Raghu (old man, drug addict prisoner)
 Muqaddar Ka Faisla (1987) .... Dayaram
 Mohabbat Ke Dushman (1988) .... Pandit
 Halaal Ki Kamai (1988)
 Bees Saal Baad (1988) .... Sarju, Nisha's Father
 Wafaa (1990) .... Rai Bahadur Shanker Dayal
 Pati Patni Aur Tawaif (1990) .... Tarachand
 Ghar Ho To Aisa (1990) .... Karamchand
 Pratikar (1991) .... Shankar Prasad
 Lakshmanrekha (1991) .... Gafoor Bhai
 Ye Hai Ghar Ki Mahabharata (1992) .... Jamnadas
 Kabhi Dhoop Kabhi Chhaon (1992)
 Shuruaat (1993) .... Jang Bahadur
 Ghar Ki Izzat (1994) .... Mona's poor dad
 Bhai No 1'' (2000) .... (final film role)

Source -

References

External links 
 

1919 births
1998 deaths
Indian male film actors
Male actors in Hindi cinema
People from Jammu (city)
Filmfare Awards winners
20th-century Indian male actors